The Inertial number  is a dimensionless quantity which quantifies the significance of dynamic effects on the flow of a granular material. It measures the ratio of inertial forces of grains to imposed forces: a small value corresponds to the quasi-static state, while a high value corresponds to the inertial state or even the "dynamic" state. It is given by:

Generally three regimes are distinguished:
 : quasi static flow
 : dense flow
 : collisional flow

One model of dense granular flows, the μ(I) rheology, asserts that the coefficient of friction μ of a granular material is a function of the inertial number only.

References

Granularity of materials